The 1911–12 Montreal Canadiens season was the team's third season and also the third season of the National Hockey Association (NHA). The club would decline to an 8–10 record and finish last.

Regular season
The team would lose two players, its top player Newsy Lalonde and Skinner Poulin to the new Pacific Coast League. Arthur Bernier joined the Wanderers. It was the second season for Georges Vezina and he would again lead the league in goals-against average with a GAA of 3.7 goals per game. The club would fall to last in the regular season standings.

Despite the fall in standings, Didier Pitre received a new automobile for his play over the last two seasons, from the La Presse newspaper, lacrosse league executives and hockey fans.

Final standings

Results

Playoffs
The team did not qualify for the playoffs.

Player statistics

Goaltending averages

Leading scorers

Source:

References

See also
 1911–12 NHA season

Montreal Canadiens seasons
Montreal Canadiens season, 1911-12